Ricardo Abraham Álvarez Casanova (born 10 February 1999) is a Chilean footballer who plays as a midfielder for Brujas de Salamanca in the Tercera A (Chile). He has represented his country at under-15 and under-17 level.

Club career
Álvarez was born in Santiago. Palestino scored the only goal of the match a minute later. He made his first appearance in the Primera División on the opening day of the 2017 Clausura, again as a substitute, in a 3–0 win away to Unión Española, and made his first start on 15 October 2017, as Colo-Colo beat Santiago Wanderers 3–0 to go top of the 2017 Transición table.

In 2020 he didn't play professional football. In 2021 he returned to the football activity and joined Trasandino de Los Andes in the Tercera A, the fourth category of the Chilean football. In 2022, he joined Brujas de Salamanca.

International career
Internationally, Álvarez was a regular member of the Chile under-15 squad in 2013. He was in the squad at the 2013 Montaigu Tournament in March, played at the Torneo de Gradisca in May and in the Copa México de Naciones in August, and scored twice at the South American U15 Championships, once in the group stage and once as Chile lost the third-place play-off.

He played for Chile under-17 at the 2015 South American U17 Championships.

Career statistics

Honours
Colo-Colo
 Primera División (2): 2015–A, 2017–T
 Copa Chile (1): 2016
 Supercopa de Chile (1): 2017

Trasandino
 Tercera A (1): 2021

References

External links
 
 
 
 Ricardo Álvarez at playmakerstats.com (English version of ceroacero.es)

1999 births
Living people
People from Santiago
Footballers from Santiago
Chilean footballers
Chile youth international footballers
Association football midfielders
Colo-Colo footballers
C.D. Huachipato footballers
Trasandino footballers
Chilean Primera División players